Mark William Chmura (born February 22, 1969) is an American former professional football player who was a tight end for the Green Bay Packers of the National Football League (NFL). He played college football for the Boston College Eagles. He was selected by Green Bay in the sixth round (157th overall) of the 1992 NFL Draft. He played his entire career with the Packers. During his playing career, his nickname was Chewy. He won Super Bowl XXXI with the Packers against his hometown team, the New England Patriots.

College career
Before his NFL career, Chmura began (and eventually ended) his career at Frontier Regional High School. Chmura then played for Boston College, where he set a school record with 164 receptions. The record has since been broken, but his mark is still 4th in school history. His 2,046 yards is also sixth in school history.

College statistics

Professional career
Chmura was drafted in the sixth round of the 1992 NFL draft, and selected to the Pro Bowl in 1995, 1997, and 1998. He played for the Packers from 1992 to 1999, whom he assisted to Super Bowl XXXI and Super Bowl XXXII. He scored the final points of Super Bowl XXXI with a 2-point conversion catch, and he finished Super Bowl XXXII with 4 catches for 43 yards and a touchdown.

In 1997, Chmura chose not to meet with United States President Bill Clinton at the White House following the Packers Super Bowl XXXI win. While many claimed that this was because Chmura was a staunch Republican, the meeting fell on the same day as the annual Mike Utley golf tournament. The tournament is something that Chmura had played in every year since 1992 to honor former Detroit Lion player Mike Utley who had been paralyzed on the field.

Chmura suffered a career-ending herniation of his C5 and C6 discs in his cervical spine. Chmura was released by the Packers in 2000. After his release, he attempted a comeback, with the Washington Redskins and the New Orleans Saints showing interest, but suffered a relapse of the injury while working out in his weight room and retired.  In 8 seasons with the Packers, Chmura finished his career in third place all-time in franchise history among tight ends with 188 receptions 2,253 yards, and 17 touchdowns in 89 games.  In 2010, he was inducted into the Green Bay Packers Hall of Fame.

Personal life

Legal trouble
On April 8, 2000 Chmura was accused of sexually assaulting the 17-year-old babysitter of his children. Chmura was tried but found not guilty of all charges. Two days after being acquitted of child enticement and third-degree sexual assault, Chmura acknowledged that his behavior at a post-prom party "wasn't something a married man should do."

Post-football career
In 2004, Chmura began hosting a Sunday morning Packers pregame show on ESPN 540 in Milwaukee and is still presently hosting the show each week. As of 2019, he also hosts The Show with Gabe Neitzel during weekday mornings on WAUK. The Show tackles a variety of Wisconsin sports topics.

From 2005 to 2009, Chmura worked as a research assistant for the Boyle Law Group. He was also an assistant football coach at Waukesha West High School, where his son, Dylan, played tight end, and son Dyson also played at Waukesha West. Dylan also played for Michigan State University. In 2017, Chmura was hired as the offensive coordinator of Greenfield High School under head coach Keith Ringelberg. 

In 2010, Mark Chmura was inducted into the Packer Hall of Fame.

In 2011, Chmura married his wife. He resides in Wisconsin with his family. Along with his wife, he owned a chain of auto collision repair businesses. In 2020, these businesses were sold.

References

External links
 

1969 births
Living people
American football tight ends
Boston College Eagles football players
Green Bay Packers players
National Conference Pro Bowl players
People acquitted of sex crimes
People from Deerfield, Massachusetts
Players of American football from Massachusetts